The Leopold Cafe and Bar is a restaurant and bar on Colaba Causeway, in Colaba area of Mumbai, India, located across from the Colaba Police station. It was the location of one of the 2008 Mumbai attacks as it was one of the first sites attacked.

History
It was founded in 1871 by Iranis (a term used for Zoroastrians in Mumbai who arrived in India in 19th century, as opposed to "Parsis") named after King Leopold of the Belgians. These Zoroastrian Iranians came to India in the late 19th and early 20th century, and many of them opened restaurants now often termed Irani cafés. It first started out as a wholesale cooking oil store and over the years has variously been a restaurant, store and pharmacy (hence the name "Leopold Cafe & Stores").

Prior to the terrorist attack, it was particularly known as a popular hangout for foreign tourists. After the attack, it is also now also popular with many Indians to commemorate the spirit of defiance. The Leopold Cafe has preserved some of the signs of the attack as a memorial, whereas at the Taj and Trident, the damage from the attacks has been repaired.

It uses an Achaemenid Persian Lion Rhyton as a part of its logo to indicate its Zoroastrian affiliation.

It is one of a couple of Irani Cafes that are still doing good business, while many others are fading away.

2008 Mumbai attacks
The cafe was an early site of gunfire and grenade explosions during the 2008 Mumbai attacks by terrorists on 26 November, at about 9:30 PM. The terrorists, approximately an hour after landing, sprayed fire inside the restaurant from outside killing 10 people and injuring many others. The restaurant was extensively damaged during the attacks. There were blood stains on the floor and shoes left by fleeing customers. 
Sourav Mishra, a Reuters reporter and one of the first media witnesses of the attack, suffered severe bullet injuries. After spending one and half minutes at the Leopold Cafe, the terrorists walked over to The Taj Mahal Palace Hotel, the main target.

The cafe defiantly reopened four days after the attack, but was reclosed on the recommendation of the police as a safety measure after two hours, due to the unexpectedly large size of crowds gathering there.

In popular culture 
The cafe was also mentioned extensively in the novel Shantaram and its sequel The Mountain Shadow. Shantaram is about an Australian bank robber and heroin addict who escapes from jail and flees to Bombay, as Mumbai was formerly called. Of all the very typical "Bombay" things and places mentioned in the book is the Leopold Café.  The novel was the reason many patrons returned after the attack.

See also
 Irani café
 Café Mondegar
 Timeline of the 2008 Mumbai attacks

References

External links 

 
 Map showing cafe location
 IraniChai, Mumbai history project

Coffeehouses and cafés in India
Restaurants in Mumbai
Restaurants established in 1871
Indian companies established in 1871
2008 Mumbai attacks
1871 establishments in India